The 1954 season was Wisła Krakóws 46th year as a club. Wisła was under the name of Gwardia Kraków.

Friendlies

Ekstraklasa

1953-54 Polish Cup

Squad, appearances and goals

|-
|}

Goalscorers

External links
1954 Wisła Kraków season at historiawisly.pl
Wisła in 1954 Ekstraklasa

Wisła Kraków seasons
Association football clubs 1954 season
Wisla